Michael Pettaway Tomlin (born March 15, 1972) is an American football coach who is the head coach for the Pittsburgh Steelers of the National Football League (NFL). Since joining the Steelers in 2007, he has led the team to ten playoff runs, seven division titles, three AFC Championship Games, two Super Bowl appearances, and a title in Super Bowl XLIII. At age 36, Tomlin became the youngest head coach to win the Super Bowl, a record which was later beaten by Sean McVay in Super Bowl LVI. Tomlin has never had a losing record during his 16 seasons as a head coach, which is the longest current streak in the NFL.

Early life
Tomlin was born in Hampton, Virginia, the younger of two sons; his brother, Eddie, is three and a half years older. Their father, Ed Tomlin, played football at Hampton Institute in the 1960s, was drafted by the Baltimore Colts, and later played for the Montreal Alouettes in the Canadian Football League. The elder Tomlin died in January 2012 from an apparent heart attack in Ocala, Florida, at the age of 63. However, Tomlin hardly knew his birth father and was raised by his mother and stepfather, Julia and Leslie Copeland, who married when Tomlin was six years old.

Tomlin graduated in 1990 from Denbigh High School in Newport News, Virginia. He graduated from the College of William and Mary, becoming a member of Kappa Alpha Psi fraternity. As a wide receiver, he was a second-team All-Yankee Conference selection in 1994.

Coaching career

College football
Tomlin's coaching career began in 1995 as the wide receiver coach at Virginia Military Institute under head coach Bill Stewart. Tomlin spent the 1996 season as a graduate assistant at the University of Memphis, where he worked with the defensive backs and special teams. Following a brief stint on the University of Tennessee at Martin's coaching staff, Tomlin was hired by Arkansas State University in 1997 to coach its defensive backs. Tomlin stayed there for two seasons, before being hired as defensive backs coach by the University of Cincinnati.

National Football League

Positions coach
Tomlin was hired as the defensive backs coach for the Tampa Bay Buccaneers in 2001 under head coach Tony Dungy, where he first learned the Tampa 2 defense that he would use in later coaching jobs.

Tomlin was retained under new head coach Jon Gruden and in 2002 and 2005, the Buccaneers led the NFL in total defense (fewest yards allowed per game). During Tomlin's tenure, the defense never ranked worse than sixth overall. When the Buccaneers won Super Bowl XXXVII in January 2003, the team recorded a Super Bowl-record five interceptions, three of which were returned for touchdowns.

Defensive coordinator
Tomlin was selected by Vikings' head coach Brad Childress to be his defensive coordinator in 2006.

Two of the players on the Vikings roster were older than Tomlin, and Tomlin had been a teammate of Vikings' safety Darren Sharper while at William and Mary. The 2006 Vikings finished with the NFL's eighth-best overall defense, but had the unusual distinction of finishing as the top-ranked defense against the run and the worst-ranked defense against the pass.

Head coach

After spending 2006 as the Vikings' defensive coordinator, Tomlin was selected to interview for the vacant head coaching position with the 2005 Super Bowl Champion Pittsburgh Steelers. With only a year of experience as a defensive coordinator, Tomlin was hired on January 27, 2007, to become the 16th Steelers head coach. Tomlin replaced Bill Cowher, who retired after spending 15 years with the team. Tomlin had also interviewed for the head coaching vacancy with the Miami Dolphins, a job that eventually went to former Indiana head coach Cam Cameron.

With Tomlin, the Steelers continued a trend of hiring head coaches in their 30s. The others were Cowher (age 34 in 1992), Chuck Noll (38 in 1969), Bill Austin (38 in 1966), John Michelosen (32 in 1948), Jim Leonard (35 in 1945), Aldo Donelli (33 in 1941), Walt Kiesling (35 in 1939), Johnny "Blood" McNally (33 in 1937), and Joe Bach (34 in 1935).
 
Tomlin is the 10th African-American head coach in NFL history and the first for the Steelers franchise. The Steelers owner, Dan Rooney, has served as the head of the NFL's diversity committee and proposed the Rooney Rule, requiring that teams interview at least one minority candidate when hiring a new head coach. Although Tomlin's ascension to an NFL head coaching job has been cited as evidence of the rule working as intended, Rooney himself disputed this, as he had already interviewed a minority candidate prior to interviewing Tomlin.

Terms of Tomlin's contract were not officially released. The Pittsburgh Post-Gazette reported a four-year deal paying $2.5 million per year, with an option for a fifth year. He is the team's third consecutive head coach to win his first game, and the first in team history to win his first game against the rival Cleveland Browns.

In contrast to Bill Cowher, who retained only longtime running backs coach Dick Hoak from Chuck Noll's staff (Hoak himself retired just before Cowher's resignation), Tomlin did retain many of Cowher's assistants, most notably defensive coordinator Dick LeBeau, whose defensive philosophy contrasted with Tomlin's. This was done in order to keep team chemistry with the players, since the team was only one year removed from a Super Bowl win at the time of Tomlin's hiring. The Steelers finished Tomlin's first season as head coach with the top-ranked defense in the NFL. Tomlin led the Steelers to the 2007 AFC North Division championship and a 10–6 record in his first year as head coach. The Steelers lost in the first round of the playoffs to the Jacksonville Jaguars, 31–29. Tomlin began his career with a 15–7 record in regular season play—as did his predecessor Cowher and all-time win-leader Don Shula. Tomlin set a Steelers record for most wins, after winning 22 games in his first two seasons as head coach; in addition he became the first Steelers coach to win division titles in his first two seasons.

When the Steelers defeated the Baltimore Ravens in the 2008 AFC Championship Game, Mike Tomlin became the youngest NFL head coach to lead his team to a Super Bowl. He also became the third African-American to coach a team to the Super Bowl, following Chicago's Lovie Smith and Indianapolis's Tony Dungy, the two opposing coaches in Super Bowl XLI. After two seasons, with a record of 22–10, he was the winningest head coach in Steelers history based on win percentage (68.8%). 

On January 29, 2009, Tomlin was named the 2008 Motorola NFL Coach of the Year. On February 1, 2009, at age 36, Tomlin became the youngest head coach to win the Super Bowl when the Steelers defeated the Arizona Cardinals in Super Bowl XLIII. The previous record was held by Jon Gruden, who was 39 when he won Super Bowl XXXVII with the Tampa Bay Buccaneers. Coincidentally, Tomlin was the defensive backs coach under Gruden when the Buccaneers won the Super Bowl and was a key component in their success that year. Tomlin's record was eclipsed by Sean McVay who was 303 days younger when winning Super Bowl LVI.

On July 13, 2010, Tomlin signed a three-year contract extension with the Steelers. In 2010, he coached the Steelers to a 12–4 record and led them to the Super Bowl for the second time in three years. In Super Bowl XLV, the Steelers lost to the Green Bay Packers by a score of 31–25.

On November 13, 2011, Tomlin won his 50th game as the Steelers' head coach with a 24–17 victory over the Cincinnati Bengals. Of the Steelers' 16 head coaches in franchise history, he was the fourth to reach this milestone. On July 24, 2012, Tomlin received a three-year contract extension through the 2016 season. The financial terms were not disclosed.

In the 2012 season, the Steelers finished 8–8 after struggling with injuries to quarterback Ben Roethlisberger and the offensive line and adjusting to the system of new offensive coordinator Todd Haley. It was the second time the Steelers failed to make the playoffs under Tomlin's tenure as head coach.

Facing the Baltimore Ravens on November 28, 2013, in a primetime Thanksgiving Day game with major playoff implications, Tomlin became the subject of controversy when video replay showed him interfering with a kick return. With the Steelers trailing 13–7 in the third quarter, Tomlin stood just off the field along the visiting team's sideline as Baltimore's Jacoby Jones broke free on a kickoff return for a potential game-breaking touchdown. Tomlin, with his back to the approaching play, appeared to glance over his shoulder then place his foot briefly onto the field as he jumped out of the way, causing Jones to veer inside where he was tackled. Several Ravens players claimed Tomlin had intentionally interfered with Jones; if officials had agreed, a touchdown could have been awarded to the Ravens based on the palpably unfair act. However, no penalty was called for interference or for standing in the white border area reserved for the officiating crew. Whether it was intentional or not, Tomlin was widely criticized in the media. Following the game, Tomlin defended himself, stating he had simply wandered too close to the field while watching the play on the stadium's Jumbotron, a mistake he said coaches often make. The league subsequently announced it was investigating the matter, with the potential of a heavy fine and forfeited draft picks. On December 4, 2013, the NFL announced that they had fined Tomlin $100,000, and hinted it was considering stripping the Steelers of one or more draft picks because his actions affected the play on the field. The $100,000 fine was tied for the second-highest for a coach in NFL history and was also tied for the highest for a coach who does not also have the powers of general manager. Then-Minnesota Vikings head coach Mike Tice was fined $100,000 in 2005 for scalping Super Bowl tickets.

In the 2019 season, Tomlin lost his starting quarterback, Ben Roethlisberger, after a Week 2 28-26 loss to the Seattle Seahawks. Although the Steelers had started the season 0-3, they got their first win in a Week 4 27-3 victory over the Cincinnati Bengals on Monday Night Football. The Steelers did lose the following week to the division-winning Baltimore Ravens in a 26-23 overtime loss. After the 1-4 start, the Steelers would go on a winning streak winning their next four games straight going 5-4. After then losing a game on the road to the Cleveland Browns with the score 21-14, the Steelers won three more straight and were 8-5 and fighting for a playoff spot with the loss of their starting quarterback Ben Roethlisberger and multiple injuries on the offense. The Steelers would lose their final three games and finish the season with an 8-8 record in spite of multiple quarterback changes and an 0-3 start.

At the end of the 2020 season, Tomlin was tied with Pete Carroll for 21st place on the NFL's all-time regular-season wins list with 145.

Tomlin was fined  by the NFL for not properly wearing a face mask, as required for coaches during the COVID-19 pandemic, during a Week 8 game in the 2020 NFL season on November 6, 2020. After Week 9 of the 2020 season, Tomlin recorded his 14th consecutive non-losing season since becoming a head coach, tying him with Marty Schottenheimer for the longest streak of all time. Tomlin announced that he tested positive for COVID-19 after the season on February 22, 2021.

On April 20, 2021, Tomlin signed a three-year contract extension to remain the Steelers' head coach through 2024. The 2022 season was Tomlin’s 16th with the team, passing predecessor Bill Cowher for the second-longest tenure as head coach of the Steelers.

Head coaching record

Personal life
Tomlin met his wife, Kiya Winston, while they were students at The College of William & Mary. He graduated with a sociology degree in 1995. They have three children: Michael Dean (b. 2000), Mason (b. 2002), and Harlyn Quinn (b. 2006). Tomlin resides with his family in Squirrel Hill and is a Christian who attends a Christian and Missionary Alliance church.

See also
 List of National Football League head coaches with 50 wins
 List of Super Bowl head coaches

References

External links

 Pittsburgh Steelers profile
 

1972 births
Living people
African-American coaches of American football
African-American players of American football
Arkansas State Red Wolves football coaches
Cincinnati Bearcats football coaches
Members of the Christian and Missionary Alliance
Memphis Tigers football coaches
Minnesota Vikings coaches
National Football League defensive coordinators
Pittsburgh Steelers head coaches
Sportspeople from Hampton, Virginia
Sportspeople from Newport News, Virginia
Super Bowl-winning head coaches
Tampa Bay Buccaneers coaches
VMI Keydets football coaches
William & Mary Tribe football players
Coaches of American football from Virginia
Players of American football from Virginia